Yuanjiang Hani, Yi and Dai Autonomous County is a county of south-central Yunnan province, People's Republic of China. The county seat is the town of Lijiang, while the county itself is under the administration of Yuxi City. It derives its name from the Red River (Asia), which is known as the Yuan River in Yunnan, and is an important provincial crossroads for access to Southeast Asia.

Administrative divisions
Yuanjiang Hani, Yi and Dai Autonomous County has 3 subdistricts, 2 towns and 5 townships. 
3 subdistricts
 Honghe
 Lijiang
 Ganzhuang
2 towns
 Manlai
 Yinyuan
5 townships

Climate
Due to its location at the bottom of a deep mountainous river valley, Yuanjiang lies at the junction of three different climate types, namely the tropical savanna climate (Köppen Aw), humid subtropical climate (Köppen Cwa) and, uniquely for China, the hot subtype of a semi-arid climate (Köppen Bsh). There are two main seasons: a dry season lasting from late November to early April, with mostly warm and dry weather (and the occasional cold snap) and the wet season covering May through September.

Ethnic groups

Hani
The Yuanjiang County Gazetteer (1993:81) lists the following Hani subgroups.
Hani 哈尼 (autonyms: Hani 哈尼, Nuomei 糯美, Nuobi 糯比)
Haoni 豪尼 (exonyms: Haoni 豪尼, Duota 多塔, Asuo 阿梭, Budu 布都, Kaduo 卡多, Biyue 碧约, Ximoluo 西摩洛, Baihong 白宏)

A Hani variety called ɣa21 lo55 (orthography: Hhalo; also known as Angluo) is also spoken in Yuanjiang County.

The Duoke 堕课 subgroup of the Hani people are located in two hamlets of Xiaogancha 小甘岔 and Xinzhai 新寨 villages near Mili Village 咪哩村 (Li & Minta 2016:8).

Yi
The Yuanjiang County Gazetteer (1993:89) lists the following Yi subgroups.
Niesu 聂苏
Shansu 山苏
Bula 卜拉
Lalu 腊鲁

Dai
The Yuanjiang County Gazetteer (1993:94) lists the following Dai subgroups and their respective locations.
Dai Le 傣泐 (Water Dai 水傣): Manlai 曼来, Mandan 曼但, Manyang 曼漾, Manfei 曼费, Manzhangna 曼章那, Manliangfei 曼梁费, Linliang 琳琅, Doulang 都郎, Xiaoyan 小燕, Longtan 龙潭, Zhega 者嘎, Lijiang 澧江
Dai Zhong 傣仲 (Large-Headed Flowery-Waist Dai 大头花腰傣): Dashuiping 大水平, Dabaitian 大白田, Longdong 龙洞, Nalu 那路, Lizhishu 荔枝树, Dalu Xinzhai 大路新寨, Nawai 那整, Shagoutou 沙沟头
Dai Ya 傣雅 (Small-Headed Flowery-Waist Dai 小头花腰傣): Ximencun 西门村, Lvlintian 绿林田, Tincun 新村, Shuanggao 双高, Gaokan 高坎, Xiaohongmiao 小红庙
Dai De 傣得 (Dong'e Flowery-Waist Dai 东峨花腰傣): Dong'eba 东峨坝
Dai Zhang 傣涨 (Ganzhuang Flowery-Waist Dai 甘庄花腰傣): Ganzhuangba 甘庄坝
Dai Ka 傣卡 (Chinese Dai 汉傣): Cuoke 撮科, Nancha 南岔, Nanma 南马, Nansa 南洒, Reshuitang 热水塘, Xizhuang 西庄
Dai Lang 傣郎 (Black Dai 黑傣): Gaozhai 高寨, Yangmahe 养马河

Bai
The Yuanjiang County Gazetteer (1993:100) lists the following locations for ethnic Bai.
Yinyuan District 因远区: Sanjia 三甲, Anren 安仁, Anding 安定, Shapu 沙铺, Beize 北泽, Tingqing 廷庆, Benkang 奔扛, Malucun 马鹿村, Budie 补垤

Languages
Bai (2010:148) lists the following languages spoken in Yinyuan Town 因远镇, Yuanjiang County.

Baihong language: in Wulong 乌龙
Suobi language: in Yuga 玉嘎
Honi language: in Anding Xinzhai 安定新寨
Biyo language: in Cangfang 仓房
Bai language: in Anren 安仁
Southwestern Mandarin: in Yinyuanjie 因远街

Transport 
China National Highway 213

References

External links
Yuanjiang County Official Website

County-level divisions of Yuxi
Hani autonomous counties
Dai autonomous counties
Yi autonomous counties
Yuanjiang Hani, Yi and Dai Autonomous County